The 2009–10 Indian Federation Cup Final was the 32nd final of the Indian Federation Cup, the top knock-out competition in India, and was contested between Kolkata giants East Bengal and Shillong Lajong on 3 January 2010.

East Bengal won the final 3–0 via penalty shootouts after the game ended 0–0 after added extra time, to claim their sixth Federation Cup title.

Route to the final

East Bengal

East Bengal entered the 2009–10 Indian Federation Cup automatically as they were already in the I-League. They were placed in Group A along with JCT, Salgaocar and Viva Kerala and their matches were played in Satindra Mohan Dev Stadium, Silchar. The tournament got off to mixed start for East Bengal as they drew goalless in their opening fixture against Viva Kerala and then defeated Salgaocar 1–0 in their second match. Yusif Yakubu scored in the 15th minute of the match. In the third match against JCT, East Bengal required a win to qualify and they managed to defeat the Punjab side by 1–0 with Bhaichung Bhutia scoring the winner in the 80th minute to take East Bengal into the Semi-finals. In the Semi-final, East Bengal faced their arch-rivals Mohun Bagan at the Nehru Stadium in Guwahati, with the memories of 5–3 defeat in the I-League match still fresh, the Red and Gold brigade took their revenge as they defeated Mohun Bagan by 2–0 with goals from Yusif Yakubu and Mehtab Hossain to reach the final. José Ramirez Barreto missed a penalty in the first half for Bagan.

Shillong Lajong

Shillong Lajong entered the 2009–10 Indian Federation Cup automatically as they were already in the I-League. They were placed in Group D along with Air India, Dempo and Pune FC and their matches were played in Nehru Stadium in Guwahati. Lajong were the underdogs in the group and begand their campaign with a 1–1 draw against Air India. In their second match, they stunned the reigning I-League champions Dempo with a 2–1 win and with Dempo already losing their first match to Pune, Lajong required a draw against Pune to secure their qualification into the Semi-finals. In the last group game, Lajong drew 1-1 and confirmed their spot in the Semis for the very first time. In the Semi-final, Lajong faced favourites Churchill Brothers but their fairy-tale run continued as they caused another upset with a 1–0 win courtesy of a solitary strike from Seikhohau Tuboi to reach their maiden Federation Cup final.

Match

Details

References

1
East Bengal Club matches
Shillong Lajong FC matches
Indian Federation Cup Finals